Kader Amadou Dodo (born 5 April 1989) is a Nigerien footballer who plays as a defender for AS SONIDEP.

Early life
Amadou was born in Niamey, Niger.

Club career
In November 2010 Amadou Kader left ASFAN and signed for Cotonsport FC de Garoua. From 2011/12 season he plays in Olympic F.C. again. He is right-footed, 185 cm tall and has 75 kg.

International career
Kader plays for the Niger national football team. He was part of the team in World Cup 2010 qualifiers, and 2012 African Nations Cup.

References

External links

1989 births
Living people
People from Niamey
Nigerien footballers
2012 Africa Cup of Nations players
2013 Africa Cup of Nations players
Niger international footballers
Olympic FC de Niamey players
AS FAN players
Coton Sport FC de Garoua players
AS SONIDEP players
Association football defenders
Nigerien expatriate footballers
Expatriate footballers in Cameroon
Nigerien expatriate sportspeople in Cameroon
2016 African Nations Championship players
Niger A' international footballers